Jellyfish are marine invertebrates.

Jellyfish may also refer to:
 Jellyfish (band), an early 1990s pop band from San Francisco
 Jellyfish (2007 film), an Israeli film
 Jellyfish (2018 film), a British film
 Jellyfish (short story collection), a 2015 short story collection by Janice Galloway
 "Jellyfish" (The String Cheese Incident song)
 "Jellyfish" (Local Natives song)
 Jellyfish Lake, a dive site in the Pacific island of Palau
 Jellyfish.com, an online shopping site
 Jellyfish, fictional characters in SpongeBob SquarePants